Tófa (Tófu) is the wife of Angantyr and mother of Hervor in Norse mythology. She is mentioned only once the Poetic Edda, in Hervararkviða. The Poetic Edda is part of the Tyrfing Cycle of Old Norse legends.

Tófu is mentioned only once, in the legendary saga of Hervor's Waking of Angantyr:

The name is a shortened form of Thorfrithr, meaning "beautiful Thor" or "peace of Thor".

See also
Hervarar saga ok Heiðreks
J. R. R. Tolkien
Legendary saga
Norse saga
Prose Edda

References

Other sources
Henrikson, Alf   (1998)  Stora mytologiska uppslagsboken (Bokförlaget Forum - Bonnier AB)

Related Reading
 Vigfússon, Gudbranðour (with F. York Powell)  (1883) Corpus Poeticum Boreale: The Poetry of the Old Northern Tongue, from the Earliest Times to the Thirteenth Century, Volume 1, Eddic Poetry   (Oxford: Clarendon Press)

Icelandic literature
Eddic poetry